The 1976–77 Alpha Ethniki was the 41st season of the highest football league of Greece. The season began on 3 October 1976 and ended on 27 June 1977. Panathinaikos won their 12th Greek title and their first one in seven years.

The point system was: Win: 2 points - Draw: 1 point.

League table

Results

Top scorers

External links
Greek Wikipedia
Official Greek FA Site
Greek SuperLeague official Site
SuperLeague Statistics

Alpha Ethniki seasons
Greece
1976–77 in Greek football leagues